The Sahara is one of the world's large deserts, located in northern Africa.

Sahara may also refer to:

Businesses
Sahara Las Vegas in Las Vegas, Nevada
Sahara Tahoe, a resort casino in South Lake Tahoe, now the Hard Rock Hotel and Casino (Stateline)
Sahara India Pariwar, an Indian company
Air Sahara, a former Indian airline, now JetLite
Sahara Airlines (Algeria), defunct domestic airline
Sahara Bank, a former bank based in Libya

Music
Sahara (Orphaned Land album)
Sahara (House of Lords album)
Sahara (Sarbel album)
Sahara (McCoy Tyner album)
Sahara (The Rippingtons album)
"Sahara," a song from the film Sivaji
"Sahara," a song by Relient K from their album Forget and Not Slow Down
"Sahara," a song by Nightwish from Dark Passion Play
"Sahara," a song by Cutting Crew from their debut album Broadcast
"Sahara" (Slash song), from the album Slash
Sahara, a band made up by Romanian singer, songwriter and producer Costi Ionita and Andrea, a female Bulgarian music singer

Books
Sahara (novel) (1992), by Clive Cussler
Sahara (Palin book) (2002), by Michael Palin

Film and television
Sahara (1919 film), an American drama
Sahara (1943 American film), a wartime drama starring Humphrey Bogart
Sahara (1943 Hindi film), a Bollywood film
Sahara (1958 film), an Indian Bollywood film
Sahara (1983 film), an American adventure film starring Brooke Shields
Sahara (1995 film), starring James Belushi, an Australian remake of the 1943 Humphrey Bogart film
Sahara (2005 film), starring Matthew McConaughey and based on the novel by Clive Cussler
Sahara (2017 film)
Sahara with Michael Palin (2002), a TV travel documentary series

Sports
Sahara Invitational, a former professional golf tournament played in Las Vegas
Sahara Cup, a former cricket series between Pakistan and India played in Canada
Sahara Elite League, a cricket competition in Kenya

People
Sahara Davenport (1984–2012), American drag queen
Sahara Khatun (1943–2020), Bangladeshi politician
Sahara Lotti (born 1980), American screenwriter and actress
Sahara Smith (born 1988), American singer-songwriter
Sahara (actress) (born 1991), Bangladeshi actress
Dylan Sahara (1992–2018), Indonesian actress
Kenji Sahara (born 1932), Japanese actor

Other uses
Apostolic Vicariate of Sahara, a former Roman Catholic missionary jurisdiction
A variant of the Breguet Deux-Ponts, a 1940s French double-decker military transport aircraft
The Oltenian Sahara, a desertified area in Romania called as such by the locals
Sahara Avenue, in Las Vegas
Sahara (LV Monorail station), a monorail station in Las Vegas
Sahara Press Service, official press agency of the government in exile of the Western Sahara
Sarah (cheetah), also known as Sahara, a female cheetah that lived in the Cincinnati Zoo, Cincinnati, Ohio

See also
Sahar (disambiguation)
List of all pages beginning with "Sahara"